Niels Schønberg Kurtzhals (25 June 1772 – 4 June 1829) was a Danish architect and master builder who contributed to the rebuilding of Copenhagen after the Copenhagen Fire of 1795.

Biography
Kurtzhals was born in Copenhagen on 25 June 1772, the son of master mason Asman/Asmond Kurtzhals and Erika Elisa Schønberg. He completed a mason's apprenticeship under court mason Johan Heinrich Brandemann and was then admitted to the Royal Danish Academy of Fine Arts where he won the small silver medal in 1789 and the large silver medal in 1789. He unsuccessfully competed for the Academy's gold medal in 1793 and 1891.

Career
Schønberg Kurtzhals was established as a master mason in 1796 and profited form the enormous need for construction services that had followed from the extensive destruction caused by the Great Fire of 1795 the previous year. He also worked for Christian Frederik Hansen on the rebuilding of the Church of Our Lady.

He eventually became an alderman of the Mason's Guild in Copenhagen. He was also a captain in the Fire Brigade and acted as valuer for Kjøbenhavns Brandforsikring (Copenhagen Fire Insurance) Fund.

Personal life
Schønberg Kurtzhals was married tp Cathrine Elisabeth Kurtzhals.

Schønberg Kurtzhals was a friend of Bertel Thorvaldsen during his student years at the academy. His sister Sophie Amalie Kurtzhals and Thorvaldsen were sweethearts before he left for Rome in 1796. On his departure, he gave her an allegorical drawing titled Time Rewards Virtue but eventually she grew tired of waiting and married master mason Johann Joachim Schlage.

Kurtzhals died on 4 June 1829 in Copenhagen. He is buried at Assistens Cemetery.

Selected buildings
 Fiolstræde 20–22 (1810–1811)
 Højbro Plads 6 (1804–1806)
 Teglgårdsstræde 10 (1798)

References

External links
 Niels Schønberg Kurtzhals 

1772 births
1829 deaths
18th-century Danish architects
19th-century Danish architects
Danish bricklayers
Burials at Assistens Cemetery (Copenhagen)
Architects from Copenhagen